Altar Wings of Roudníky are two surviving wings of late Gothic retable, which probably originated in one of Prague's contemporary workshops for village (Utraquist) parish church. The altar wings exhibited at the Hussite Museum in Tábor have the status of a national cultural monument.

Altar Wings of Roudníky are the two sides painted plates accrued before 1486. The wings were cut back and secondarily coated with baroque marbling, making reconversion survived the 17th and 18th centuries, since the inside of the right wing is the oldest depiction of the burning of Jan Hus depicted in the Czech Gothic panel painting. It is believed to be a fragment of an altarpiece, which has not survived. The anonymous painter portrayed "Crucifixion" and "The Last Supper", possibly in monstrance with the body of the Lord. Due to the fact that both wing plates are shown, it is assumed that the patron was Jakoubek of Vřesovice, a Hussite captain, from Roudníky, and his son John.

Description 
Each of the truncated wing plates has dimensions of 162 x 68 cm, framed 179 x 82 cm. The inner side of the left wing appears at the top of the Beheading of St. James the Great, while at the bottom is shown the Burning of St. Lawrence. The Beheading of St. James depicts two figures in discussion, one of which with a headdress in brocade in the form of a miter, the high priest Abiathar. The figure is a reference to the prelates who Hus condemned. In the lower part shows the death of St. Lawrence, while the figure on the right is identifiable with the Emperor Decius. On the outer side of the plate is left St. James the Greater pilgrim's staff and St. Lawrence deacon holding the book and palm branch. Contralateral altar wing (board 2 inv. No. 4336) has on the inside at the top of Passion of Sebastian, in the lower half of the burning of Jan Hus. On the outside is depicted St. James the Less, at the bottom of St. Stephen deacon. While the martyrdom of St. Sebastian depicts the Emperor Diocletian (left figure with a crown on his head), the "Burning" is dominated by the figure of a man with a princely cap. This represents Rhine Louis of Wittelsbach, which Sigismund handed Hus over to death. On the altar, cover it and Jan Hus assigned to prvomučedníkům Christian church – St. James, Vol. Sebastian and St. Lawrence. The fact that the left bottom plate is shown "baking" St. Lawrence, while on the right wing is depicted the "burning of Jan Hus", is not accidental. These are parallels between the forms of martyrdom of the saints.

Dating 
The altar wings are not dated nor signed. The time of their creation can be inferred either by comparing to the manuscript painters in contemporary context, or biographical content of the patron of the altar. Jaromir Pešina states that the author of the piece was in contact with St. George's altar, whose work dates to early in the second half of the 15th century, newly assigned to Czech late Gothic panel painting. Milena Bartlová considered the painter as a member of the Prague workshop environment with knowledge of the Nuremberg masters (Hans Pleydenwurff) and Brussels patterns (Dirck Bouts). Jan Royt states that the artist who painted panels was aware of the Wrocław Master painting in the altar of St. Barbara, which could be instrumental in these Western European influences. These conjectures allow dating the genesis of the retable in 1470 to 1480s. In the event that the purchaser of the altar was a Hussite captain Jakoubek of Vřesovice, who died in 1467, dating emergence retable it can be shifted to the 1460s. The Church of St. Wenceslaus in Roudníky, for whose altar it was intended, is already mentioned as a parish in 1352, and was rebuilt in the Gothic style in 1486.

The wings' fate 
In 1966, during restoration of the village church, students of the Academy of Fine Arts, Prague discovered two door panels on which were concealed, beneath overpainting, a baroque quality pre-medieval painting dating to the 1470s. Restoration of the original painted panels was done by Bohuslav and Ludmila Slaný in 1975. The last conservation and restoration work on both boards conducted by academic painter Naděžda Mašková and Miroslav Křížek in the year 2013/14. The altar wings were bought from the Trmice parish in the Diocese of Litoměřice for the amount of CZK 12 million paid from the funds of the Ministry of Culture of the Czech Republic. Today it is one of the most important artistic artefacts, in the Hussite Museum in Tábor.

Art-historical importance 
The finding of altar wings of Roudniky became one of the few documented Utraquist works in the development of painting in Bohemia after a period of stagnation on topics and painting techniques at the time of George of Poděbrady. It was a diversion in Prague acting "Master of St. George's altar" from a conservative home environment and the influence of Nuremberg painting from the mid-15th century, which influenced the anonymous Master. The Roudniky panels also likely originate from the Prague workshop environment.

The meaning of the altar wings of Roudniky lies in their iconography. Illustrations of Jan Hus as a holy martyr are captured in their oldest form, as we know from the few surviving fragments of altars from the middle of the 15th century. This monumental painting presents us with Jan Hus as a man of small stature with a round face, beardless, dressed in a liturgical white shirt. His representation with other religious saints assigns him to providence, and the founding legitimacy of the early church. Utraquists needed to present their own saint, with the traditional saints, as one of the reasons their relationship to the paintings had religious themes. 
Conversely the painting served as a means of spreading reform ideas, but had a didactic function for laymen unfamiliar with iconography.

Exhibitions 
The altar wings of Roudniky was exhibited in the Teresian Wing of the Old Royal Palace at Prague Castle in the exhibition "Jan Hus 1415–2005" (30 June – 25 September 2005). Again, the two boards exhibited in the Imperial Stables at Prague Castle during the exhibition "Art of the Czech Reformation", which took place from 16 December 2009 to 4 April 2010. The new acquisition exhibiting an altar wing of the Hussite Museum in Tabor in February 2009, which is got into professional care at the end of 2012. the last two altar slabs enriched the exhibition "Prague Hus and the Hussite 1415–2015", which was held in the Clam-Gallas Palace in Prague from 25 September 2015 and 24 January 2016.

References

Sources 
 Homolka J. et al. Pozdně gotické umění v Čechách (1471-1526). Vydal Odeon, Praha, 1968.
 Beránek J. et al. Trans Montes, Podoby středověkého umění v severozápadních Čechách (Mudra A.  Ottová M,. eds.). Vydala Filozofická fakulta UK v Praze, 2014.

External links 
 http://www.jan-hus.cz/?q=cs/exponaty/oltarni-kridla-z-roudnik.html
 http://www.chabarovice.cz/pruvodce-mestem 
 

Gothic paintings
15th-century establishments in Europe
Jan Hus
Altarpieces